The Colonial Cup is an international rugby league football challenge match played between the United States Tomahawks and the Canada Wolverines. The inaugural match was played in September, 2010 at the Richardson Memorial Stadium at Queen's University in Kingston, Ontario. The match was won by the USA Tomahawks 22-16.

In 2011, the Colonial Cup was expanded to a 'home and away' series. Each team won their home fixture; the USA won the first of the two games 18-2 with Canada securing their first win in the second match with an 18-16 win. USA won the series with an overall aggregate score of 34-20. In 2012, the Cup was again contested over 2 games, with the USA Tomahawks winning both games. In 2013, the series has been expanded to a best 2 of 3 series. In 2014, Canada won their first ever Colonial Cup trophy.

Results 
Note that in a year where each team wins an even number of games, the winner of the cup is decided by aggregate scores.

2013 Colonial Cup

Game 1

Game 2

Game 3

Game 4

2014 Colonial Cup

Lone Fixture

2015 Colonial Cup

Game 1

(*Was initially set to be held at Canada's Lamport Stadium in Toronto on 19 September)

Game 2

Game 3

(*Also played as part of 2017 Rugby League World Cup qualifying)

2016 Colonial Cup

Game 1

(*Also played as part of 2016 America's Cup)

Game 2

See also

Pacific Rugby League International
Anzac Test
Four Nations
European Cup
Rugby League World Cup

References

External links

Rugby league international tournaments
Rugby league in Canada
Rugby league in the United States